Jack Laurence Chalker (December 17, 1944 – February 11, 2005) was an American science fiction author. Chalker was also a Baltimore City Schools history teacher in Maryland for 12 years, retiring during 1978 to write full-time. He also was a member of the Washington Science Fiction Association and was involved in the founding of the Baltimore Science Fiction Society.

Career and family life

Chalker was born and raised in Baltimore, Maryland. Some of his books said that he was born in Norfolk, Virginia although he later claimed that was a mistake; he attended high school at the Baltimore City College. Chalker earned a BA degree in English from Towson University in Towson, Maryland, where he was a theater critic for the school newspaper, The Towerlight. During 2003, Towson University named Chalker their Liberal Arts  Alumnus of the Year. He received a Master of Arts in Liberal Studies from Johns Hopkins University in Baltimore.

Chalker intended to become a lawyer, but financial problems caused him to become a teacher instead. He taught history and geography in the Baltimore City Public Schools from 1966 to 1978, most notably at Baltimore City College and the now defunct Southwest Senior High School. Chalker lectured on science fiction and technology at the Smithsonian Institution in Washington, D.C., the National Institutes of Health in Bethesda, Maryland, and numerous universities.

Chalker was a member of the Maryland Air National Guard's 135th Special Operations Group, where he was a member of the group information office. He was deployed into Baltimore during the Baltimore riot of 1968.

Chalker was married in 1978 and had two children, David, a game designer, and Samantha, a computer security consultant.

Chalker's hobbies included esoteric audio, travel, and working on science-fiction convention committees. He also had a great interest in ferryboats; at his fiancée's suggestion, their marriage was performed on the Roaring Bull boat, part of the Millersburg Ferry, in the middle of the Susquehanna River in Pennsylvania.

Science fiction
Chalker joined the Washington Science Fiction Association during 1958, and during 1963 he and two friends founded the Baltimore Science Fiction Society. Chalker attended every World Science Fiction Convention, except one, from 1965 until 2004. He published an amateur SF journal, Mirage, from 1960 to 1971 (a finalist nominee for the 1963 Hugo Award for Best Fanzine), producing ten issues. Another journal, Interjection, was published 1968–1987 in association with the Fantasy Amateur Press Association. Chalker also initiated a publishing house, Mirage Press, Ltd., for releasing nonfiction and bibliographic works concerning science fiction and fantasy.

Chalker's awards included the Daedalus Award (1983), The Gold Medal of the West Coast Review of Books (1984), Skylark Award (1980), and the Hamilton-Brackett Memorial Award (1979).  He was twice a nominee for the John W. Campbell Award for Best New Writer and for the Hugo Award twice. Chalker was posthumously awarded the Phoenix Award by the Southern Fandom Confederation on April 9, 2005.

Chalker was a three-term treasurer of the Science Fiction and Fantasy Writers of America. Chalker was also the co-author (with Mark Owings) of The Science Fantasy Publishers (third edition during 1991, updated annually), published by Mirage Press, Ltd, a bibliographic guide to genre small press publishers which was a Hugo Award nominee during 1992. The Maryland Young Writers Contest, sponsored by the Baltimore Science Fiction Society, was renamed "'The Jack L. Chalker Young Writers Contest" effective April 8, 2006.

Novels
Chalker is best known for his Well World series of novels, but he also wrote many other novels (most, but not all, part of a series, or large novels which were split into 'series' by the publishers), and at least nine short stories.

Many of Chalker's works involve some physical transformation of the main characters. For instance, in the Well World novels, immigrants to the Well World are transformed from their original form to become a member of one of the 1,560 sentient species that inhabit that artificial planet.  Another example would be that the Wonderland Gambit series resembles traditional Buddhist jataka-type reincarnation stories set in a science fiction environment. Samantha Chalker announced that Wonderland Gambit might be made into a movie, but supposedly its close resemblance to The Matrix resulted in the project being canceled.

At the time of his death, Chalker left one unfinished novel, Chameleon. He was planning to write another novel, Ripsaw, after Chameleon.

Illness and death

On September 18, 2003, during Hurricane Isabel, Chalker passed out and was rushed to the hospital with a diagnosis of a coronary occlusion. He was later released, but was severely weakened. On December 6, 2004, he was again rushed to hospital with breathing problems and disorientation, and was diagnosed with congestive heart failure and a pneumothorax. Chalker was hospitalized in critical condition, then upgraded to stable condition on December 9, though he did not regain consciousness until December 15.  After several more weeks in deteriorating condition and in a persistent vegetative state, with several transfers to different hospitals, Chalker died on February 11, 2005, of kidney failure and sepsis at Bon Secours Hospital in Baltimore, Maryland.

Some of Chalker's remains are interred in the family plot at Loudon Park Cemetery in Baltimore. The remainder were distributed off the ferry between Hainan Island and the Chinese mainland, a ferry in Vietnam, White's Ferry on the Potomac River in Virginia on Father's Day 2007, and on author H. P. Lovecraft's grave in Providence, Rhode Island on December 17, 2005.

Bibliography

See also
 :Category:Novels by Jack L. Chalker

References

External links
 
 Jack L. Chalker Young Writers' Contest
 Jack L. Chalker at The Encyclopedia of Science Fiction

1944 births
2005 deaths
20th-century American male writers
20th-century American novelists
20th-century American short story writers
21st-century American male writers
21st-century American novelists
21st-century American short story writers
American fantasy writers
American male novelists
American male short story writers
American science fiction writers
Baltimore City College alumni
Deaths from kidney failure
Deaths from sepsis
Infectious disease deaths in Maryland
Novelists from Maryland
Schoolteachers from Maryland
Towson University alumni
Writers from Baltimore